Longitude Festival is a music festival that takes place during July every year in Dublin, Ireland. Since 2013, Marlay Park has been home to the festival. It is organised by MCD Productions and Festival Republic.

When the festival first started in its early years the line up was mostly bands and singer songwriters such as Phoenix, Kodaline, and Sam Smith. As the festival evolved in later years it mostly consisted of hip hop artists such as Stormzy, Travis Scott, and Ski Mask the Slump God.

There are multiple bars around the festival owned by Heineken, Bacardi, and Red Bull. Around the venue multiple food stalls can be found with a wide variety of food and drink. There is also the Longitude Lounge which is sponsored by Coca Cola and is accessible by VIP ticket holders.

Three Ireland offer free portable battery banks at the festival for a small deposit that can be redeemed if you give the battery bank back by the end of the festival.  The festivals age restrictions require under 16's to be accompanied by an adult. Longitude Festival has a sister festival in the United Kingdom called Latitude Festival.

2013
Longitude Festival 2013 was announced in late 2012 by the organizers of Oxegen Festival. The 2013 festival had six different stages: the Longitude Main Stage, Heineken Live Project Stage, Phantom Green stage, Woodlands Stage, Red Bull Music Academy Stage, and The Dirty Old Town Speakeasy.

The first festival took place on Friday 19 July to Sunday 21 July 2013. Some of the acts on the line-up were:

Phoenix (Friday Headliner), Vampire Weekend (Saturday Headliner), Kraftwerk (Sunday Headliner), Foals, Jake Bugg, Kodaline, The Maccabees, Hot Chip, MØ.

2014
The 2014 Longitude Festival was held from Friday 18 July to Sunday 20 July 2014. Some of the acts on the line-up were:

Ben Howard (Friday Headliner), Disclosure (Saturday Headliner), Massive Attack (Sunday Headliner), Bastille, Bombay Bicycle Club, The 1975, Hozier, Rudimental, Sam Smith

2015
The 2015 Longitude Festival was held from Friday 17 July to Sunday 19 July 2015. Some of the acts on the line-up were (headline acts in bold):

Hozier (Friday Headliner), Alt-J (Saturday headliner), The Chemical Brothers (Sunday Headliner), The Vaccines, Catfish and the Bottlemen, Wolf Alice, Years and Years, James Blake, Pusha T

2016

The 2016 Longitude Festival was held from Friday 15 July to Sunday 17 July 2016. Some of the artists that played at the 2016 festival include:

Kendrick Lamar (Friday headliner), Major Lazer (Saturday headliner), The National (Sunday headliner), The Lumineers, The Coronas, Father John Misty, Jamie xx, Chvrches, Diplo

2017

The 2017 Longitude Festival was held from Friday 14 July to Sunday 16 July 2017 with an attendance of 35,000 people. Some of the artists that played at the 2017 festival include:

Stormzy (Friday headliner), The Weeknd (Saturday headliner), Mumford & Sons (Sunday headliner), Picture This, G-Eazy, Skepta, Leon Bridge, Mac Miller, Brave Giant

Line-up 
Line-up: (headliners in bold):

2018

The 2018 Longitude Festival was held from Friday 13 July to Sunday 15 July 2018 with an attendance of 40,000 people.

Longitude Festival 2018 had seven stages: the Longitude Main Stage, Heineken Stage, Heineken Live Your Music Stage, Red Bull Music, Life Style Sports Stage, Three Made By Music, and the Desperados Sound Stage.

Performer cancellations 
Blackbear was supposed to perform at the festival but cancelled due to health issues. Cardi B was also to perform at the 2018 festival but cancelled weeks prior as she was pregnant at the time.

Conor McGregor 
Conor McGregor was spotted on the first day of the festival during J. Cole's performance.

Line-up 

Line-up: (headliners in bold):

2019

The 2019 Longitude Festival was held from Friday 5 July to Sunday 7 July 2019 with an attendance of 40,000 people.

Longitude Festival 2019 had six stages: The Longitude Main Stage, Heineken Stage, Heineken Live Your Music Stage, Spin House Party, Elevation Stage, and Three Made By Music.

A$AP Rocky controversy and other cancellations 

A$AP Rocky was supposed to headline on Friday night, but during July he was arrested in Sweden after an altercation on the street in Stockholm. He was replaced by Ski Mask the Slump God.

Chance the Rapper and Lil Uzi Vert were also scheduled to perform at the festival but both pulled out weeks prior.

Conor McGregor 

Conor McGregor was spotted for the second year in a row at the festival during Cardi B's performance.

US Embassy 

The US Embassy in Ireland issued a security alert to notify US citizens that they should avoid going to the 2019 festival as there is a risk of violence. The festival promoters response to the US Embassies warning was that it is "beyond ridiculous".

Line-up 

Line-up (with headliners in bold):

2020
The 2020 Longitude Festival was due to be held from Friday 3 July to Sunday 5 July 2020.

COVID-19 festival cancellation 
On 21 April 2020, the Government of Ireland announced that outdoor public gatherings of more than 5,000 people would be banned until 31 August 2020 at the earliest due to COVID-19 concerns. On 22 April 2020, Longitude Festival posted to their website and all of their social media accounts that the festival had been cancelled and would return in 2021. This is the first time in the festival's history that it had to be cancelled.

KSI self announcement 
On 12 February 2020 at the NME Awards in London, rapper and YouTube personality, KSI announced that he would be performing at multiple festivals that year including Longitude Festival.

Performer cancellations 

J Hus was supposed to perform on Friday but cancelled in early February. Pop Smoke was also supposed to perform on Saturday but died on 19 February 2020, after being fatally shot during an invasion of his home in Hollywood Hills, California.

Cancelled line-up 

The line up that was planned for the festival (with headliners in bold):

2021
Longitude Festival 2021 was due to take place during 2–4 July 2021.

COVID-19 festival cancellation
On 10 May 2021, Longitude Festival was cancelled for the second year in a row due to COVID-19 concerns.

Cancelled line-up
Line-up (with headliners in bold):

2022
Longitude Festival 2022 was held from Friday the 1st of July to Sunday the 3rd of July 2022.

Line-up 
Line-up: (headliners in bold):

Attendance

Attendance figures depict total attendance during each day of the festival.

40,000 is Marlay Park's maximum capacity; therefore, the festival attendance may not increase in the future.

See also

List of hip hop music festivals
Electric Picnic
Life Festival
Oxegen
Marlay Park

References

External links 

Music festivals in Ireland
Hip hop music festivals
Music festivals established in 2013